Cape Cod Maritime Museum is a maritime museum at 135 South Street in Hyannis, Massachusetts with a focus on Cape Cod's maritime history, boat building, yachting, and nautical art. The museum formerly contained the remains of the Sparrow Hawk, the earliest known surviving ship from the colonial American era, which is currently stored at Plymouth's Pilgrim Hall Museum.

See also
List of maritime museums in the United States

References

External links

Official website

Maritime museums in Massachusetts
Museums in Barnstable County, Massachusetts
Archaeological museums in Massachusetts